Fath de Nador is a Moroccan football club currently playing in the GNFA 1, the third tier of Moroccan football. The club was founded in 1971 and they play at the Stade Municipal de Nador.

References

Football clubs in Morocco
1971 establishments in Morocco
Sports clubs in Morocco